The Right to Be Italian is the only studio album by the new wave band Holly and the Italians. The album had a troubled recording process that took more than a year to be completed; it was released in February 1981 by Virgin Records. The album was reissued in 2002 in the US by Wounded Bird Records with bonus tracks.

The album peaked at No. 177 on the Billboard 200.

Critical reception
Trouser Press called The Right to Be Italian "a new wave classic of romantic ups and downs, leather-jacket rebellion and kitsch culture, carried mightily on Vincent’s tough-girl attitude, full-throated singing, gale-force Brill Building melodies and chunky rhythm guitar presence." The Rough Guide to Rock deemed the album "a lost masterpiece."

Track listings
All songs written by Holly Beth Vincent, except where indicated
Side one
"I Wanna Go Home" – 3:57
"Baby Gets It All" – 3:14
"Youth Coup" – 2:41
"Just Young" – 5:23
"Miles Away" (Mark Sidgwick) – 3:38

Side two
"Tell That Girl to Shut Up" – 2:59
"Just for Tonight" (Larry Kusik, Ritchie Adams, Wes Farrell) – 2:38 (The Chiffons cover)
"Do You Say Love" – 3:15
"Means to a Den" – 3:13
"Rock Against Romance" – 5:39

2002 CD edition
"I Wanna Go Home" – 3:58
"Rock Against Romance" – 5:41
"Youth Coup" – 2:44
"Just Young" – 5:25
"Miles Away" – 3:40
"Tell That Girl to Shut Up" – 3:02
"Just for Tonight" – 2:40 
"Do You Say Love" – 3:17
"Baby Gets It All" – 3:16
"Means to a Den" – 3:31
"Fanzine" – 2:59
"It's Only Me" – 2:17
"Poster Boy" – 2:28
"Miles Away" (single edit) – 3:27

Other editions
There is a 2010 Japanese CD reissue that preserves the original track order for the tracks from the original album, but with the same bonus tracks, in the same order, as the 2002 reissue.

Personnel
Holly and the Italians
Holly Beth Vincent – lead vocals, guitars
Mark Sidgwick – bass, additional guitars, backing vocals
Steve Young – drums, backing vocals
Mike Osborn – drums, African clan drums, percussion, backing vocals

Additional musicians
Anton Fig – drums on "Just Young"
Paul Shaffer – grand piano, organ
Jerry Harrison – synthesizers
Angela Brand – recorder
Torrie Zito – string arrangements and conductor
The Uptown Horns
Ellie Greenwich – lead vocals on "Just for Tonight"

Production
Richard Gottehrer – producer
Thom Panunzio – engineer
John Brand – remixing

References

1981 debut albums
Albums produced by Richard Gottehrer
Virgin Records albums
New wave albums by American artists